Gamasellus kurilensis is a species of mite in the family Ologamasidae.

References

kurilensis
Articles created by Qbugbot
Animals described in 1981